Giambra is a surname. Notable people with the surname include:

Joel Giambra (born 1957), American politician
Joey Giambra (1931–2018), American boxer
Joey Giambra (musician) (1933–2020), American jazz musician